Mark Rivers (born 26 November 1975) is an English former professional footballer who played as a forward from 1994 until 2006 notably for Crewe Alexandra and Norwich City.

Career

Crewe Alexandra
Mark Rivers was a product of the Crewe Alexandra F.C. Academy, signing his first professional contract in May 1994. He made his Crewe debut on 4 October 1995 coming on as a substitute in an EFL League Cup second round tie against Sheffield Wednesday at Hillsborough. He scored his first Crewe goal, again after coming on as a substitute, in Crewe's 8–0 win over Hartlepool United at Gresty Road on 17 October 1995. On his first league start, he scored twice in Crewe's 3–1 win over Brentford on 28 October 1995. During the 1995–1996 season, he scored 14 goals in all competitions for his home town club. The following season he helped Crewe to a Second Division play-off final victory over Brentford that saw the club promoted to the second tier for the first time in its history. In the First Division, Rivers scored eight goals in 37 appearances for the Railwaymen during the 1997-98 season, and then scored ten goals in 48 appearances the following season. During the 1999–2000 season, he netted nine times in 36 appearances, followed by ten goals in 38 appearances in 2000–01. To this point, 25-year-old Rivers had scored 58 goals in 239 games for Crewe.

Norwich City
Norwich initially bid for Rivers on transfer deadline day in March 2001. Another bid was made in May 2001 as Nigel Worthington sought a pacy striker to partner Iwan Roberts, and share the goal scoring responsibilities. Both bids were rejected but in June 2001, Crewe and Norwich came to agreement over a deal worth approximately £1,000,000. Whilst Rivers was on holiday and had  signed a contract or passed a medical, the deal was concluded by both clubs as a forgone concussion. Rivers finally signed for Norwich at the end of June 2001.

Rivers made 37 appearances during Norwich's almost-successful 2001–02 campaign but only completed 90 minutes on one occasion giving the Carrow Road faithful concern over his long term fitness. He started the 2002-03 season well but suffered an injury against Watford that saw him miss over a month's action. He finished the campaign with 32 appearances and four goals to his credit.

Four goals in four league games at the start of the 2003-04 season established him as the Canaries' leading scorer until injury again forced him out of the side. When fit, he could not displace either loan signing Kevin Harper or youngster Ian Henderson. Rumours from Carrow Road also suggested a bust-up between Rivers and manager Nigel Worthington. Unable to get a first team place, Rivers made it clear that he needed first team football. Crewe offered to take him on loan in January 2004 but Norwich refused and he returned to the Norwich team in the 1–0 defeat to Bradford on 10 January 2004, albeit as a substitute.

Return to Crewe
In June 2004, Rivers was the subject of speculation linking him with a move to Burnley. At the beginning of July 2004, Norwich and Rivers agreed to cancel his contract as he wanted first team football. He joined neighbours Ipswich Town almost immediately, playing in their pre-season friendly against Peterborough on 10 July 2004. When Ipswich decided against taking him on, Rivers returned to Crewe on trial. He signed a two-year deal with his former club on 20 July at half-time during Crewe's friendly with Everton. Over the next one-and-a-half seasons, he made 56 appearances for the Cheshire side, scoring 11 times.

Carlisle United
On 23 January 2006, Rivers signed for Carlisle United until the end of their 2005–06 season, making six appearances. He left by mutual consent on 28 April 2006.

Honours
with Crewe Alexandra
Football League Second Division play-off final winner: 1997

with Norwich City
Football League First Division league winner: 2003-04 Football League First Division

References

1975 births
Living people
Sportspeople from Crewe
English footballers
Association football midfielders
Association football forwards
Crewe Alexandra F.C. players
Norwich City F.C. players
Carlisle United F.C. players